India-Ghana relations are the bilateral relations between India and Ghana. As members of the Commonwealth, India maintains a High Commission in Accra and Ghana has its High Commission in New Delhi.

History 

In 1817, Thomas Bowdich led a British delegation to Kumasi in order to improve relations between the Ashanti Empire and the United Kingdom. An Ashanti prince was skeptical of British motives in Ashanti, citing British presence in India. According to historian Edgerton, "The next day, an Asante prince asked Bowdich why, if Britain were so selfless, it had behaved so differently in India."

India opened a consulate in Accra in 1953 and established full-fledged diplomatic relations with Ghana immediately after its independence in 1957. The Indian High Commission in Accra is also concurrently accredited to Burkina Faso, Togo and Sierra Leone. Ghana established its High Commission in New Delhi after its independence. The first President of Ghana, Kwame Nkrumah and India's first Prime Minister, Jawaharlal Nehru, shared a strong personal bond of friendship. Presidents Nkrumah, Hilla Limann, John Rawlings and John Kufuor have made state visits to India while Prime Minister P V Narasimha Rao visited Ghana in 1995. India and Ghana are founding members of the Non Aligned Movement, the Government of India's Team-9 initiative and are members of the Commonwealth.

Indians and Indian culture in Ghana 
There are about ten thousand Ghanaian Indians and Persons of Indian Origin living in Ghana today with some of them having been there for over 70 years. Ghana is home to a growing indigenous Hindu population that today numbers 13,000 families. Hinduism first came to Ghana only in the late 1940s with the Sindhi traders who migrated here following India's Partition. It has been growing in Ghana and neighbouring Togo since the mid-1970s when an African Hindu monastery was established in Accra.

Economic ties

Trade 
Trade between India and Ghana amounted to US$818 million in 2010-11 and is expected to be worth US$1 billion by 2013. Ghana imports automobiles and buses from India and companies like Tata Motors and Ashok Leyland have a significant presence in the country. Ghanaian exports to India consist of gold, cocoa and timber while Indian exports to Ghana comprise pharmaceuticals, agricultural machinery, electrical equipment, plastics, steel and cement.

Economic cooperation 
The Government of India has extended $228 million in lines of credit to Ghana which has been used for projects in sectors like agro-processing, fish processing, waste management, rural electrification and the expansion of Ghana's railways. India has also offered to set up an India-Africa Institute of Information Technology (IAIIT) and a Food Processing Business Incubation Centre in Ghana under the India-Africa Forum Summit.

Investments 
India is among the largest foreign investors in Ghana's economy. At the end of 2011, Indian investments in Ghana amounted to $550 million covering some 548 projects. Indian investments are primarily in the agriculture and manufacturing sectors of Ghana while Ghanaian companies manufacture drugs in collaboration with Indian companies. The IT sector in Ghana too has a significant Indian presence in it. India and Ghana also have a Bilateral Investment Protection Agreement between them. India's Rashtriya Chemicals and Fertilisers is in the process of setting up a fertiliser plant in Ghana at Nyankrom in the Shama District of the Western Region of Ghana. The project entails an investment of US$1.3 billion and the plant would have an annual production capacity of 1.1 million tonnes, the bulk of which would be exported to India. There are also plans to develop a sugar processing plant entailing an investment of US$36 million. Bank of Baroda, Bharti Airtel, Tata Motors and Tech Mahindra are amongst the major Indian companies in Ghana.

Technical co-operation 
India extends scholarship for the training of Ghanaian personnel in India through its Indian Technical and Economic Cooperation Programme and the Special Commonwealth Assistance for Africa Programme(SCAAP). India has trained over 1,100 Ghanaian students and professionals since the commencement of the programme. India has also helped Ghana with expertise in IT and Communications (ICT) and helped develop the Tema Community Centre into a modern ICT facility. The Ghana-India Kofi Annan Centre of Excellence in ICT is another result of India's cooperation with Ghana in this field. The Centre for Development of Advanced Computing, Pune is to now provide PARAM supercomputing technology and training to the centre from 2012. The Indian Government supported the Electoral Commission of Ghana in conducting the Presidential and Parliamentary polls there in December 2012 by providing it with indelible ink and has also been helping Ghana develop an electronic system for revenue mobilisation. Ghana is also part of the Pan-African e-Network project initiated by India and Ghana's Kwame Nkrumah University of Science and Technology has commenced degree courses in collaboration with institutions of higher education in India. The new palace of the Ghanaian President, called Flagstaff House, has been built by India using a $60 million soft loan from the Government of India.

See also 
 Hinduism in Ghana
 Indian Association of Ghana

References 

 
Bilateral relations of India
Africa–India relations
India
India
Ghana